Seed is a Canadian single-camera sitcom. The series starred Adam Korson as Harry Dacosta, sperm donor, and followed his interactions with new-found relatives that had been conceived from the donation.

The series premiered on February 4, 2013 on Citytv, and was briefly picked up by the U.S. CW network (however, it was removed after two episodes due to low ratings). In 2014, the series was cancelled by Citytv after two seasons.

Synopsis
An ill-equipped bachelor discovers his foray into sperm donation has resulted in many offspring and finds himself entangled in the lives of his new-found children and their less-than-thrilled families.

Characters
 Adam Korson as Harry Dacosta, a bartender who donated semen. In his profile, numbered XC-3000, he notes he is a doctor and a graduate of Princeton. 
 Carrie-Lynn Neales as Rose, who meets Harry on a bus on the way to the fertility clinic, as she wants to get pregnant, but doesn't want a relationship.
 Amanda Brugel as Michelle, one of Billy's mothers.
 Stephanie Anne Mills as Zoey, one of Billy's mothers.
 Laura de Carteret as Janet, Anastasia's mother and a child psychologist.
 Matt Baram as Jonathan, Anastasia's (non-biological) father and a lawyer.
 Vanessa Matsui as Irene, Harry's boss, and owner of the Pour House Bar.
 Abby Ross as Anastasia, Harry's 15-year-old daughter. She recently found out her parents used a sperm donor and that Jonathan is not her biological father. 
 William Ainscough as Billy Jones-Krasnoff, Harry's nine-year-old son. He lives with his two moms, Michelle and Zoey.

Production
Principal photography began on the first season of Seed in October 2012 in Halifax, Nova Scotia.

Although the show's premise closely resembles the 2011 Canadian film Starbuck, producer Joseph Raso has clarified in interviews that he already had the idea in development before Starbuck was released.

Reception
The Globe and Mail called the series "deeply silly, and the kind of good, off-kilter comedy that we can do with aplomb in Canada... There’s no recipe, but among the requirements are characters who are fabulously immature, plus some sharp, unostentatious writing and a version of stoner humour that works even if you’re not five miles high."

In 2013, the series was picked up for U.S. broadcast by The CW. However, on July 23, 2014, the network pulled the show from its schedule after two airings due to low ratings.

Series overview

Episodes

Season 1 (2013)

Season 2 (2014)

Home release
Entertainment One Films released Season One on DVD in Region 1 on October 21, 2014.

References

External links

 
 

2010s Canadian sitcoms
2013 Canadian television series debuts
2014 Canadian television series endings
Citytv original programming
Television shows filmed in Halifax, Nova Scotia
Television series by Force Four Entertainment
The CW original programming